The 1977–78 Midland Football League was the 78th in the history of the Midland Football League, a football competition in England.

Premier Division

The Premier Division featured 18 clubs which competed in the previous season, no new clubs joined the division this season.

League table

Division One

Division One featured 15 clubs which competed in the previous season, along with three new clubs:
Kimberley Town reserves
Ripley Town, joined from the East Midlands Regional League
TI Chesterfield

League table

References

Midland Football League (1889)
8